Nokomis Regional High is a secondary school located in Newport, Maine, United States. Nokomis is a public school which accepts students from Newport, Corinna, Palmyra, Hartland, St. Albans, Plymouth, Etna and Dixmont

The school principal is Mary Nadeau. The school mascot is the Warrior, and the sports team name is "Nokomis Warriors".

Notable alumni
 Dean Cray, State Legislator
 Josh Tardy, State Legislator
 Aaron Frey, Maine Attorney General

References

External links
 

Public high schools in Maine
Schools in Penobscot County, Maine